"Best" S. Ramasamy is a politician and entrepreneur from the Indian state of Tamil Nadu. He is the president of the Kongunadu Munnetra Kazhagam party (KMK). He is also the chairman of well known "Best Group" - a group of  apparel and textile related companies in the city of Tirupur.

Early life
Born into a small agricultural family in a place near Tirupur, Best Ramasamy struggled during his early stages after he lost his father at the age of 7. Due to difficulty in the cultivation of his dry agricultural lands, at the age of 12, he moved into Tirupur in search of employment. and joined as a worker in a small garment factory.

He holds B.A in Economics and in History and is fluent in Tamil, English and Hindi.

As Entrepreneur
From the age of 12 to 18, he worked as an employee in a small garment factory in Tirupur. Bitten by his entrepreneurial zeal, at the age of 19, he started a shop to sell firewood. From nearby villages, people gathered firewood and brought to his shop. He would break them into small sizes and sold it to factories and houses.

During middle of 1960's, Tirupur was witnessing a tremendous growth in garment industry. So, at the age of 20 in 1966, with an initial investment of Rs.10,000, he started his own garment factory in the name of 'Best Knitting Company'. Later he travelled extensively to various foreign countries and established his company as one of the most successful industry in Tirupur. Currently, he has consolidated his companies under the name 'Best Corporation Pvt Ltd' and leads it as its Chairman.

Today, companies under Best Group employs more than 5000 people in and around Tirupur.

Political career
Starting from the year 1978, he worked in various Kongu Organisations although his main contribution to Kongu people started in the year 1988 as one of the founders of Kongu Vellala Goundergal Peravai. Later he became president in the year 2007. He was declared as the president of "Kongunadu Munnetra Kazhagam" when the party was launched in 2009 at Coimbatore.

He contested in 2009 Lok Sabha elections as a KMK candidate in Pollachi Constituency and came third securing over one lakh (1,03,004) votes.

See also
 Kongunadu Munnetra Kazhagam
 E.R.Easwaran

References

External links 
 Official Website of KMK Party

Indian Tamil people
Tamil Nadu politicians
Living people
1946 births